is a Japanese private railway company which operates in Shiga Prefecture, and a member of the Seibu group since 1943. The company is named after the Ōmi Province, the former name of the present-day Shiga. The railway is nicknamed  by local users because of its noisy sound.

History 
Ohmi Railway is the longest private railway company in Shiga. The company was founded in 1896 and started train services from Hikone to Echigawa in 1898.

Lines 

Ohmi Railway consists of three lines: the Main Line, and two branch lines, the Yōkaichi Line and the Taga Line.

The Main Line connects with the Tōkaidō Main Line (Biwako Line), the Hokuriku Main Line and the Tōkaidō Shinkansen at Maibara, the Biwako Line at Hikone, and the Kusatsu Line and the Shigaraki Kōgen Railway at Kibukawa. The Yōkaichi Line connects with the Biwako Line at Ōmi-Hachiman.

At first, the Main Line was planned to connect Hikone and Fukawa (now Kōnan) and run through to Ujiyamada. The Yōkaichi Line had a 2.8 km branch line from Shin-Yōkaichi to Misono between 1930 and 1964.

Other services 
The company also operates bus lines, taxis, Hachimanyama Ropeway, Shizugatake Lift, ships of Lake Biwa, a tour operator, an onsen hotel, two expressway service areas, a campsite, a driving school and parks in Shiga.

References

External links 

 Ohmi Railway Group 
 Ohmitetudo channel - YouTube

 
Railway companies of Japan
Rail transport in Shiga Prefecture